The 2020–21 Western Michigan Broncos men's basketball team represented Western Michigan University in the 2020–21 NCAA Division I men's basketball season. The Broncos, led by first-year head coach Clayton Bates, played their home games at University Arena in Kalamazoo, Michigan as members of the Mid-American Conference. In a season limited due to the ongoing COVID-19 pandemic, they finished the season 5–16, 4–12 in MAC play to finish in ninth place. As a result, they failed to qualify for the MAC tournament.

The MAC announced the removal of division play in-conference beginning this year.

Previous season
The Broncos finished the 2019–20 season 13–19, 6–12 in MAC play to finish in a tie for fifth place in the West Division. They lost in the first round of the MAC tournament to Toledo.

On March 11, 2020, the school announced that Steve Hawkins would not be returning as head coach, ending his 17-year tenure with the team. On April 2, it was announced that long-time assistant Clayton Bates would be named the Broncos' next head coach.

Roster

Schedule and results 

|-
!colspan=12 style=| Non-conference regular season

|-
!colspan=9 style=| MAC regular season

|-

Sources

References

Western Michigan Broncos men's basketball seasons
Western Michigan Broncos
Western Michigan Broncos men's basketball
Western Michigan Broncos men's basketball